Yao Juan (born July 18, 1983) is a Paralympian athlete from China competing mainly in category F43/44/62/64 Javelin Throw, Shot Put and Discus Throw events. She has competed in six Paralympics 2000, 2004, 2008,
2012,
2016 & 2020 and she won five gold medals. She also won nine medals (7 Gold) at the IPC Athletics World Championships.

External links
 

1983 births
Living people
Chinese female javelin throwers
Chinese female discus throwers
Chinese female shot putters
Paralympic athletes of China
Paralympic gold medalists for China
Athletes (track and field) at the 2000 Summer Paralympics
Athletes (track and field) at the 2004 Summer Paralympics
Athletes (track and field) at the 2008 Summer Paralympics
Athletes (track and field) at the 2012 Summer Paralympics
Athletes (track and field) at the 2016 Summer Paralympics
Athletes (track and field) at the 2020 Summer Paralympics
Medalists at the 2000 Summer Paralympics
Medalists at the 2008 Summer Paralympics
Medalists at the 2012 Summer Paralympics
Medalists at the 2016 Summer Paralympics
Medalists at the 2020 Summer Paralympics
World record holders in Paralympic athletics
World Para Athletics Championships winners
Sportspeople from Wuxi
Paralympic medalists in athletics (track and field)
Discus throwers with limb difference
Javelin throwers with limb difference
Shot putters with limb difference
Paralympic discus throwers
Paralympic javelin throwers
Paralympic shot putters